First Light is a historical novel by Sunil Gangopadhyay, centering on historical figures like Rabindranath Tagore, Swami Vivekananda, Ramakrishna, Bankim Chandra Chattopadhyay, Ishwar Chandra Vidyasagar, George Curzon. It is set in India during the second half of the nineteenth century of Indian history, focusing on the Bengal Renaissance.

References

Historical novels
Novels set in West Bengal
Indian Bengali-language novels